They Cut Off the Little Boy's Hair is the English-language version of Vladimír Mišík and Etc...'s first studio album, Etc..., released in 1978 by Supraphon (the original, Czech version was released in 1976). The album is conceptually inspired by the poetry of Josef Kainar, especially his poem "Stříhali dohola malého chlapečka".

Track listing

Side A
 Bazaar of Change (Bazarem proměn) 3:00 
 Cinema (Biograf) 7:30
 Why Does the Rose Fade and Die (Proč ta růže uvadá) 4:00 
 Tea and Crumpets (Jednohubky) 3:40

Side B
 Where's My Desk Gone? (Kde je můj stůl?) 3:40 
 They Cut Off the Little Boy's Hair (Stříhali dohola malého chlapečka) 3:40 
 Lady Vamp 3:10
 I Have a Date at Half Past Four (Já mám schůzku o půl páté) 3:10 
 Son of Daedalus (Syn Daidalův) 5:10

References

1978 albums